Ella Campbell Scarlett (22 November 1864 – 30 October 1937) was an English physician who became the first woman medical practitioner in Bloemfontein, South Africa and the first woman doctor at the Royal Columbian Hospital in Canada.

Early life and education
Scarlett was born at Abinger Hall in Surrey, England, 22 November 1864. Her parents were William Scarlett, 3rd Baron Abinger and Helen ( Magruder) Scarlett (niece of John B. Magruder).

In 1897, Scarlett studied medicine at the London School of Medicine for Women and the Royal Free Hospital for five years, and spent some time in Korea at the Royal Court.

She married on 14 December 1901, to Percy Hamilton Synge. At the time of the wedding, Synge was 29 years old and Scarlett was 37 years old.

Career
In 1902, Scarlett traveled to Norvalspont, South Africa to serve, by government appointment, in the concentration camp as part of the Boer War.  Scarlett then moved to Bloemfontein, where she was part of a six-member committee appointed by the British Minister of War to investigate conditions in the concentration camps (other members of the committee included Millicent Fawcett and Jane Elizabeth Waterston). In 1903 Scarlett was assigned the position of doctor to Normal College and the Dames Instituut.

In 1907, Scarlett moved to Edmonton, Canada, for five years before moving to New Westminster. In 1915 Scarlett worked for the Canadian Red Cross teaching first aid and home nursing, as well as organising the first Women's Volunteer Reserve Corps of Canada and becoming the first woman doctor at the Royal Columbian Hospital. In August 1915, Scarlett traveled to Serbia to distribute medical supplies and visited British prisoner of war camps in Germany. She died in 1937 in London.

References 

1864 births
1937 deaths
Daughters of barons
People from Surrey (before 1889)
20th-century women physicians
20th-century English medical doctors
English women medical doctors
English expatriates in South Africa
English expatriates in Canada
People of the Second Boer War
20th-century South African physicians
South African women physicians
South African physicians
20th-century Canadian physicians
Canadian women physicians
Red Cross personnel